The Artistic Gymnastics World Championships are the world championships for artistic gymnastics governed by the Fédération Internationale de Gymnastique (FIG). The first edition of the championships was held in 1903, exclusively for male gymnasts. Since the tenth edition of the tournament, in 1934, women's events are held together with men's events.

The FIG was founded in 1881 and was originally entitled FEG (Fédération Européenne de Gymnastique), but changed its name in 1921, becoming the Fédération Internationale de Gymnastique (FIG); this name change roughly correlates with the actual naming of the World Championships.  Although the first such games were held in 1903, they were not initially entitled the 'World Championships'.  The first competition ever actually referred to as a 'World Championships' was a competition held in 1931 that, while referred to in an official FIG publication as the "First Artistic Men's World Championships", often seems to go ignored by various authorities in the sport.  The championships prior to the 1930s, beginning back in 1903, would eventually be recognized, retroactively, as the World Championships.

Although the FIG had changed its name from the FEG back in 1921, the true transcontinental nature of the sport would not start to change at the World Championship level until a substantially later time.  Perhaps the first non-European delegation to participate at a World Championships was Mexico, which sent a men's team who travelled all the way to compete at the 1934 Worlds in Budapest, a trans-Atlantic endeavor they repeated at the 1948 London Summer Olympics - a rare non-European delegation appearance even 14 years later.  Perhaps the first African contingent was the Egyptian one which offered forth a full male team at the 1950 World Championships in Basel.  By the time of these World Championships, a total of 60 male athletes from 6 countries and 53 female athletes from 7 countries comprised the competitive field.  By the 2013 World Championships, the competition had grown to include 264 men from 71 countries and 134 women from 57 countries.  As of 2019, over sixty editions of the championships have been staged, and over forty countries have earned medals in both men's and women's artistic gymnastics events.

The most successful nation, both in gold medal results and total number of medals, is the former Soviet Union, and China is the second. United States is the third most successful country in gold medal results while Japan is the third in total number of medals. Since the fall of the Soviet block, the traditional powerhouses in men's and women's individual and team events have been Russia, Belarus, Ukraine, China, United States, Japan, and Romania with increasing results from Great Britain and Brazil and a recent decrease in results from the delegations from Romania and Belarus. Currently, the championships are held annually in non-Olympic years, and all individual events (event and all-around) are held at every championships. However, the team event is omitted in the year after an Olympic Games.

Editions

All-time medal table
Last updated after the 2022 World Championships.

Men's events

Women's events

Overall

Notes
 Official FIG documents credit medals earned by athletes from Bohemia as medals for Czechoslovakia. 
 Official FIG documents credit medals earned by athletes from Austria-Hungary as medals for Yugoslavia. 
 Official FIG documents credit medals earned by athletes from former Soviet Union at the 1992 World Artistic Gymnastics Championships in Paris, France, as medals for CIS (Commonwealth of Independent States).
 At the 1993 World Artistic Gymnastics Championships in Birmingham, Great Britain, Azerbaijani-born athlete Valery Belenky earned a bronze medal competing as an unattached athlete (UNA) because Azerbaijan did not have a gymnastics federation for him to compete. Later, official FIG documents credit his medal as a medal for Germany.
 At the 2021 World Artistic Gymnastics Championships in Kitakyushu, Japan, in accordance with a ban by the World Anti-Doping Agency (WADA) and a decision by the Court of Arbitration for Sport (CAS), athletes from Russia were not permitted to use the Russian name, flag, or anthem. They instead participated under name and flag of the RGF (Russian Gymnastics Federation).

Statistics

Multiple gold medalists
Boldface denotes active artistic gymnasts and highest medal count among all artistic gymnasts (including those not included in these tables) per type.

Men

All events

Individual events

Note
Alois Hudec of Czechoslovakia won 3 individual gold medals at the commemorative competition which was held in Paris, France, in 1931 and referred to as the "First Artistic Men's World Championships". Later he won 2 gold and 3 silver medals on the individual events at the 1934 and 1938 World Artistic Gymnastics Championships – that would be make him five-time World champion and five-time World silver medalist at the individual events. However, 1931 results often seem to be ignored by various authorities in the sport and this commemorative competition is not fully considered as the World Championships.

Women

All events

Individual events

Note
Few non-primary sources state that at the 1938 World Artistic Gymnastics Championships, in Prague, Vlasta Děkanová of Czechoslovakia won 2 or 3 golds on multiple apparatuses. According to some sources, Děkanová and her compatriot Matylda Pálfyová shared gold medals in parallel bars (this event was replaced with uneven bars in the women's program at all subsequent world championships), while others state that Pálfyová shared this victory with Polish gymnast Marta Majowska, not Děkanová. The only primary source on the subject, a book officially released by the International Gymnastics Federation containing the results of the World Championships from 1903 to 2005, informs that medals were distributed only in the team all-around event and in the individual all-around event. Therefore, according to official reports, Děkanová's official number of gold medals is four, two in individual all-round (1934 and 1938) and two in team events (1934 and 1938) - not six or seven.

Best results of top nations by event

Men's results

Only nations with medals in five or more events are listed. Positions below third place are not taken into account. Results for Germany and West Germany have been combined.

Women's results

Only nations with medals in three or more events are listed. Positions below eighth place are not taken into account. Results for Germany and West Germany have been combined.

See also

Junior World Artistic Gymnastics Championships
Gymnastics at the Summer Olympics
Gymnastics at the Youth Olympic Games
Gymnastics World Championships
List of gymnastics competitions
Major achievements in gymnastics by nation

References

External links
Gymnastics International Federation

 
Artistic gymnastics competitions
Recurring sporting events established in 1903